The 2020 Valdostan regional election took place on 20 and 21 September 2020 in Aosta Valley, Italy. The election was originally scheduled to take place on 19 April 2020, but was then postponed first to 10 May and then delayed for a second time due to the coronavirus pandemic in Italy.

Electoral law
The Regional Council of Aosta Valley is composed by 35 members. The Council is elected for a five-year term. There is only one regional constituency. The President of Aosta Valley is elected by the Council. The electoral law was recently changed by the L.R. 16/2017 and the L.R. 9/2019.

The election of the Regional Council is based on a direct choice for the candidate and it is possible to express only one preference for the list. If a single party list or a coalition of party lists gets more than 42% of valid votes cast, it is assigned a majority bonus of 21 seats. If no one reach this threshold, the seats are determined proportionally. For the proportional allocation there are two thresholds: given the largest remainder method by dividing the valid votes cast for all lists and the seats to be assigned, if a party list doesn't reach the minimum quota required, the party list is excluded to the allocation of the seats. However, if a party list gets only one seat during the first allocation of seats, it is excluded and its seat is reallocated.

Background
Aosta Valley returned to the vote earlier than the deadline by decision of the interim president Renzo Testolin, following investigations into the infiltration of the 'Ndrangheta in the politics of the region at all levels. Former president Antonio Fosson was investigated for electoral exchange between the political and mafia. The same accusation is directed at two former assessors of his government, Laurent Viérin (former president) and Stefano Borrello. Two other former presidents – Pierluigi Marquis and Augusto Rollandin – were also seeking the support of the local clans who infiltrated the Valley, according to the prosecutor's office.

Parties and candidates
The following parties will participate in the election:

Results

Popular vote by list

Turnout

Aftermath
After the election, a centre-left/regionalist coalition government was formed. It was headed by Erik Lavévaz, leader of the Valdostan Union (UV), and composed of three UV members (President and two ministers), three from the "Progressive Civic Project" and one each from the Valdostan Union, Edelweiss and Mouv'.

See also
2020 Italian regional elections

References

Elections in Aosta Valley
2020 elections in Italy
Valdostan regional election 2020